Gardenia barnesii is a species of plant in the family Rubiaceae native to the Philippines and Malaysia.

References

elata